Oligarcha is a genus of moths of the family Noctuidae.

Species
 Oligarcha coryphaea (Püngeler, 1900)

References
Natural History Museum Lepidoptera genus database
Oligarcha at funet

Noctuinae